Man from Headquarters is a 1942 American crime film directed by Jean Yarbrough and written by John W. Krafft, Rollo Lloyd and Edmond Kelso. The film stars Frank Albertson, Joan Woodbury, Dick Elliott, Byron Foulger, John Maxwell and Robert Kellard. The film was released on January 23, 1942, by Monogram Pictures.

Plot

Cast          
Frank Albertson as Larry Doyle
Joan Woodbury as Ann Weston
Dick Elliott as Elwin A. Jonas
Byron Foulger as Hotel Manager Clark
John Maxwell as Marvin
Robert Kellard as Hotel Clerk
Mel Ruick as District Attorney Johnson
Gwen Kenyon as Hat Check Girl
Jack Mulhall as Whalen
Christine McIntyre as Telegraph Girl
Max Hoffman Jr. as Louis Padroni
Paul Bryar as Knuckles
Arthur O'Connell as Goldie Shores
Maynard Holmes as T. Fulton Whistler
Charlie Hall as Newspaper Photographer 
Irving Mitchell as Nate
George O'Hanlon as Weeks

References

External links
 

1942 films
1940s English-language films
American crime films
1942 crime films
Monogram Pictures films
Films directed by Jean Yarbrough
American black-and-white films
1940s American films